Ardino (formerly ) is a town in southern Bulgaria, in the Rhodope Mountains. It is located in Kardzhali Province and it is also close to Smolyan.

It is famous for its textile industry. It has a machine-building factory and a tobacco manufacturing industry. Tourist attractions include the Belite Brezi, the Eagle rocks and the Dyavolski most (Devil's bridge). Under Ottoman rule, Ardino, then known in Turkish as Eğridere, was a kaza centre in the Sanjak of Gümülcine in the Adrianople Vilayet before the Balkan Wars. Ardino received its name in 1934 and was declared as a town in 1960. Ardino is the birthplace of Sabahattin Ali, Turkish novelist, poet and journalist.

Villages

 Avramovo
 Ahryansko
 Bashevo
 Bistrogled
 Bogatino
 Borovitsa
 Brezen
 Byal izvor
 Chervena skala
 Chernigovo
 Chubrika
 Glavnik
 Golobrad
 Gorno Prahovo
 Gurbishte
 Dedino
 Doyrantsi
 Dolno Prahovo
 Dyadovtsi
 Enyovche
 Hromitsa
 Iskra
 Kitnitsa
 Kroyachevo
 Latinka
 Levtsi
 Lenishte
 Lyubino
 Mak
 Mlechino
 Musevo
 Padina
 Paspal
 Pesnopoy
 Pravdolyub
 Ribartsi
 Rodopsko
 Rusalsko
 Svetulka
 Sedlartsi
 Sinchets
 Spoluka
 Srunsko
 Star chitak
 Stoyanovo
 Suhovo
 Temenuga
 Turna
 Turnoslivka
 Yabulkovets
 Zhaltusha

Notable natives
 Sabahattin Ali (1907–1948), Turkish novelist, short-story writer, poet, and journalist

References

Towns in Bulgaria
Cities and towns in the Rhodopes
Populated places in Kardzhali Province